The 1948–49 Scottish League Cup was the third season of Scotland's second football knockout competition. The competition was won by Rangers, who defeated Raith Rovers in the Final.

First round

Group 1

Group 2

Group 3

Group 4

Group 5

Group 6

Group 7

Group 8

Quarter-finals

Ties

Replays

2nd Replay

Semi-finals

Final

References

General

Specific

League
1947-48